Mario Meštrović  (born 22 May 1970 in Osijek) is a retired Croatian footballer who last played for HNK Rijeka.

External links
 

1970 births
Living people
Sportspeople from Osijek
Association football midfielders
Croatian footballers
HNK Cibalia players
HNK Hajduk Split players
Deportivo Alavés players
Hapoel Tel Aviv F.C. players
Hapoel Kfar Saba F.C. players
Hapoel Jerusalem F.C. players
HNK Rijeka players
Croatian Football League players
Segunda División players
Israeli Premier League players
Liga Leumit players
Croatian expatriate footballers
Expatriate footballers in Spain
Croatian expatriate sportspeople in Spain
Expatriate footballers in Israel
Croatian expatriate sportspeople in Israel